This is a list of areas and neighbourhoods in Coimbatore by region. The city is divided on the basis of composition into four major parts: North, Central, South and East. Coimbatore east and its surrounding region is primarily a textile and industrial hub. Central Coimbatore is the commercial heart of the city. Coimbatore, is surrounded by the mountains on the west, and the reserve forests on the northern side. The entire western and northern part of the district borders the Western Ghats with the Nilgiri biosphere. A western pass to Kerala, popularly referred to as the Palghat Gap provides its boundary with the metropolitan area limits.

Central Coimbatore

 Townhall
 Selvapuram
 Rathinapuri
 Tatabad
 Sivananda Colony
 Gandhipuram
 Ukkadam
 Kottaimedu
 Ramnagar
 Sukrawarpettai
 R.S Puram
 Saibaba Colony
 Venkatapuram
 Ponnairajapuram
 Race Course
 Gopalapuram
 Sidhapudur
 Avarampalayam

South Coimbatore

 Sundakkamuthur
 Podanur
 Karumbukadai
 Sundarapuram
 Kurichi
 Eachanari
 Chettipalayam
 Vellalore
 Kuniyamuthur
 Sugunapuram
 Kovaipudur
 Sokkampudhur

East Coimbatore

 Ramnathapuram 
 Singanallur
 Puliakulam
 Ondipudur
 Varadarajapuram
 Peelamedu
 Meena Estate
 Udayampalayam
 Nanjundapuram
 Nehru Nagar
 Vilankurichi
 Ganapathy 
 Cheranmanagar
 Nallampalayam
 Gandhimanagar
 Chinniampalayam
 Sowripalayam
 G.V Residency
 Uppilipalayam

West Coimbatore

 Perur
 Vadavalli
 Veerakeralam
 Veedapaati
 P.N.Pudur
 Kalveerampalayam

Suburban Coimbatore

The Suburban Coimbatore includes minor places in the Tiruppur district. Suburban Coimbatore is commonly called as Greater Coimbatore.

Northern suburbs of Coimbatore

 Karamadai
 Periyanaickenpalayam
 Poochiyur
 RAVATHA KOLLANUR

North-Western Suburbs of Coimbatore

 Thadagam
 Maruthamalai
 Pannimadai

North-Eastern Suburbs of Coimbatore

 Saravanampatti
 Kalapatti
 Keeranatham
 Pachapalayam

South-Western Suburbs of Coimbatore

 Walayar
 K.G Chavadi
 Ettimadai
 Odaiyakulam
 Thirumalayampalayam

Eastern Suburbs of Coimbatore

 Somanur
 Irugur
 Sulur

Western Suburbs of Coimbatore

 Thondamuthur
 Pooluvapatti
 Veerakeralam
 Karunya Nagar
 Thenkarai
 Narasipuram
 Puthur
 Alanthurai
 Veddapaati

Southern Suburbs of Coimbatore

 Kinathukadavu
 Myleripalayam
 Malumichampatti
 Othakalmandapam
 Samathur
 Suleeswaranpatti
 Maddukarai
 Annamalai hills

Neighbourhoods in Coimbatore
Coimbatore
Coimbatore
Coimbatore-related lists